Lam Nam Nan National Park is a national park in Thailand's Phrae and Uttaradit provinces.

Geography
The park's area is 622,839 rai ~ .
The Sirikit Dam, impounding the Nan River, forms a large reservoir in the park. The park's streams also feed the Yom River, a tributary of the Nan.

History
Lam Nam Nan was proposed for inclusion in the national parks system. Lam Nam Nan was declared a national park, which was announced in the Government Gazette, volume 115, part. 67 kor, dated 30 September 1998.
Since 2002 this national park has been managed by Protected Areas Regional Office 11 (Phitsanulok)

Attractions
The Sirikit Dam reservoir is a popular boating recreation spot and features a number of small islands and reefs. Choeng Thong waterfall is a year-round waterfall located on the Phrae side of the park. Phu Phaya Pho mountain offers sweeping views of the surrounding mountains and forested landscape.

Flora
The park features numerous forest types, including deciduous, deciduous dipterocarp and dry evergreen forest. 
Plants include:

Fauna
The number of sightings in the park are:
Thirty-three species of mammels, include:

Birds,the park has some 80 species, of which 60 species of passerine from 22 families, represented by one species:

and some 20 species of non-passerine from 8 families, represented by one species:

Reptiles, include:

Amphibians,include:

Fishes, include:

Location

See also
 List of national parks in Thailand
 List of Protected Areas Regional Offices of Thailand

References

National parks of Thailand
Geography of Phrae province
Tourist attractions in Phrae province
Geography of Uttaradit province
Tourist attractions in Uttaradit province
1998 establishments in Thailand
Protected areas established in 1998